Quandary may refer to:

 Dr. Quandary, a fictional character in the video game The Secret Island of Dr. Quandary
 Mount Quandary, a mountain of Antarctica
 Quandary Peak, the highest summit of the Tenmile Range in Colorado